Sourceror or sourcerer may refer to:

 Procurement officer, someone who sources goods
 Programmer, someone who works with source code
 Sourceror, a disassembler in the assembler Merlin
 Sourcerer, a type of wizard, especially featured in Terry Pratchett's novel Sourcery
 Sourcerer, a type of magic user in the video game Divinity: Original Sin II
 Sourcerer, a fictional character from the children's TV show ReBoot: The Guardian Code

See also
 Sorcerer (disambiguation)
 Source (disambiguation)